Speranza is a genus of moths in the family Geometridae erected by John Curtis in 1828.

Species
The following species are classified in the genus. This species list may be incomplete.
Speranza abruptata
Speranza amboflava
Speranza anataria
Speranza andersoni
Speranza argillacearia – mousy angle moth
Speranza austrinata
Speranza benigna
Speranza bitactata – split-lined angle moth
Speranza boreata
Speranza brunneata
Speranza colata
Speranza coloradensis
Speranza confederata
Speranza coortaria – four-spotted angle moth
Speranza deceptrix
Speranza decorata
Speranza denticulodes
Speranza evagaria – drab angle moth
Speranza exauspicata
Speranza exonerata
Speranza extemporata
Speranza flavicaria
Speranza graphidaria
Speranza grossbecki
Speranza guenearia
Speranza helena
Speranza hesperata
Speranza inextricata
Speranza loricaria
Speranza lorquinaria – Lorquin's angle moth
Speranza marcescaria
Speranza occiduaria
Speranza pallipennata
Speranza perornata
Speranza plumosata
Speranza prunosata
Speranza pustularia – lesser maple spanworm moth
Speranza quadrilinearia
Speranza ribearia – currant spanworm moth
Speranza saphenata
Speranza schatzeata
Speranza semivolata
Speranza simplex
Speranza simpliciata
Speranza subcessaria – barred angle moth
Speranza sulphurea – sulphur angle moth
Speranza trilinearia
Speranza umbriferata
Speranza varadaria – southern angle moth
Speranza wauaria

References

Macariini